Aaron Paul Beard (born 15 October 1997) is an English cricketer. He made his first-class debut on 8 May 2016 for Essex against Sri Lankans during Sri Lanka's tour of England. Opening the bowling, he took a wicket in each of his first two overs, finishing with figures of 4/62 in the first innings. He made his List A debut on 5 May 2019, for Essex in the 2019 Royal London One-Day Cup. He made his Twenty20 debut on 2 August 2019, for Essex in the 2019 t20 Blast.

In April 2022, Beard and Mason Crane were signed on loan for one month to Sussex, after the club had multiple players unavailable due to injury.

References

External links
 

1997 births
Living people
English cricketers
Essex cricketers
Sussex cricketers
Sportspeople from Chelmsford